This is a list of Black creatives who have been nominated for a Tony Award for outstanding achievement in theater.

While some American people of African ancestry prefer "Black," and others prefer "African American"; "African American" is considered a less appropriate umbrella term for people of African ancestry worldwide because it obscures other ethnicities or national origins. Thus, "Black" is a more inclusive umbrella term.

Facts and figures

Multiple nominations
As of 2022 ceremony: 
 George C. Wolfe – 24
 Audra McDonald – 9
 August Wilson – 9
 Paul Tazewell – 8
 Harold Wheeler – 7
 Lloyd Richards – 6
 Stephen Byrd – 5
 Gregory Hines – 5
 Bill T. Jones – 5
 Donald McKayle – 5
 Ron Simons – 5
 Savion Glover – 4
 David Alan Grier – 4
 Allen Lee Hughes – 4
 Toni-Leslie James – 4
 Alia Jones – 4
 James Earl Jones – 4
 LaChanze – 4
 Brian Stokes Mitchell – 4
 Mbongeni Ngema – 4
 Condola Rashad – 4
 Stew – 4
 Hilton Battle – 3
 Camille A. Brown – 3
 Vinnette Carroll – 3
 Viola Davis – 3
 André De Shields – 3
 Brandon Victor Dixon – 3
 Micki Grant – 3
 Joshua Henry – 3
 Geoffrey Holder – 3
 Kenny Leon – 3
 Henry LeTang – 3
 Lynn Nottage – 3
 Tonya Pinkins – 3
 Gilbert Price – 3
 Phylicia Rashad – 3
 Ruben Santiago-Hudson – 3
 Melvin Van Peebles – 3
 Courtney B. Vance – 3
 Daryl Waters – 3
 Mary Alice – 2
 Dede Ayite – 2
 Debbie Allen – 2
 Gretha Boston – 2
 Charles Brown – 2
 Chuck Cooper – 2
 Cleavant Derricks – 2
 Ann Duquesnay – 2
 Charles S. Dutton – 2
 George Faison – 2
 Laurence Fishburne – 2
 K. Todd Freeman – 2
 Whoopi Goldberg – 2
 Luther Henderson – 2
 Linda Hopkins – 2
 Ernestine Jackson – 2
 Michael R. Jackson – 2
 Quincy Jones – 2
 Joaquina Kalukango – 2
 John Kani – 2
 Eartha Kitt – 2
 John Legend – 2
 Adriane Lenox – 2
 Claudia McNeil – 2
 S. Epatha Merkerson – 2
 Patina Miller – 2
 Zakes Mokae – 2
 Brian Moreland - 2
 Dominique Morisseau - 2
 Sahr Ngaujah – 2
 Winston Ntshona – 2
 Sophie Okonedo – 2
 Jeremy Pope – 2
 Billy Porter – 2
 Josephine Premice – 2
 Vivian Reed – 2
 Roger Robinson – 2
 Anika Noni Rose – 2
 Diana Sands – 2
 Anna Deavere Smith – 2
 Emilio Sosa – 2
 Ron Taylor – 2
 Lynne Thigpen – 2
 Tamara Tunie – 2
 Leslie Uggams – 2
 Ben Vereen – 2
 Adrienne Warren – 2
 Denzel Washington – 2
 Jason Michael Webb – 2
 Lillias White – 2
 Dick Anthony Williams – 2
 Billy Wilson – 2
 Oprah Winfrey – 2
 Jeffrey Wright – 2
 Samuel E. Wright – 2

Multiple wins
As of 2022 ceremony: 
 Audra McDonald – 6
 George C. Wolfe – 5
 Hinton Battle – 3
 James Earl Jones – 3
 Ron Simons – 3
 Viola Davis – 2
 Geoffrey Holder – 2
 Bill T. Jones – 2
 Billy Porter – 2
 Phylicia Rashad – 2

Book of a Musical

Choreography

Costume Design

Costume Design of a Musical

Costume Design of a Play

Direction of a Musical

Direction of a Play

Excellence in Theatre Education Award

Lighting Design

Lighting Design in a Play

Musical

Orchestrations

Original Score (Music and/or Lyrics) Written for the Theatre

Performance by an Actor in a Featured Role in a Musical

Performance by an Actor in a Featured Role in a Play

Performance by an Actor in a Leading Role in a Musical

Performance by an Actor in a Leading Role in a Play

Performance by an Actress in a Featured Role in a Musical

Performance by an Actress in a Featured Role in a Play

Performance by an Actress in a Leading Role in a Musical

Performance by an Actress in a Leading Role in a Play

Play

Regional Theatre Tony Award

Revival of a Musical

Revival of a Play

Sound Design of a Play

Special Theatrical Event

Special Tony Awards

References

tonyawards.com

Tony Awards
African-American theatre
Lists of African-American people